A'me Lorain (born Amy Trujillo on May 11, 1967, in Simi Valley, California) is an American singer who fronted The Family Affair.

A'me Lorain & The Family Affair released one album on RCA Records in 1989, titled Starring In...Standing in a Monkey Sea. A 1990 single, "Whole Wide World", was a dance hit in the United States, peaking at #9 on the Hot Dance Play chart and #37 on the Hot Dance Maxi Singles chart. The song also crossed over to the Billboard Hot 100, peaking at #9, and appeared on the soundtrack to the film True Love. The funk band was a true "family affair" with her brother Freddy Trujillo  on bass and her then-husband Victor Indrizzo playing guitar and drums.

As of 2011, A'me was working on new dance material for an independent label.

References

External links
Twitter

Singers from California
People from Simi Valley, California
Living people
1967 births
20th-century American singers
21st-century American singers
20th-century American women singers
21st-century American women singers